Independent working class education is an approach to education, particularly adult education, developed by labour activists, whereby the education of working-class people is seen as a specifically political process linked to other aspects of class struggle. The term, abbreviated to (IWCE), is particularly linked to the Plebs' League.

Ruskin College
When Ruskin College was founded in 1899 the founders Walter Vrooman and Charles A. Beard declared "We shall take men who have been merely condemning our social institution, and we will teach them how, instead, to transform those institutions, so that instead of talking against the world, they will begin methodically and scientifically to possess the world."

Proletcult
Having outlined the "fundamental requirement of the modern working class" as  the use of "the economic power of the workers for the overthrow of the capitalist system, the abolition of wagery and the inauguration of a classless commonwealth" Cedar and Eden Paul wrote in 1921 that the events of the previous decade had clearly shown that the political efforts to achieve such a goal would be misguided unless based on knowledge:
"The workers' demand for education is no longer a demand for graduated doses of bourgeois culture. It is a demand for an education which shall make the workers understand their place in the economic and social system, and shall help them in the successful waging of the class war. It is a demand for Independent Working-Class Education"
The Pauls' went on to identify the Plebs League as "the most effective exponent of the demand for a distinctively proletarian culture", whereas they described the Workers Educational Association, as making a "parade of impartiality" which masked "an unconscious bias in favour of the institutions of the bourgeois state". The Pauls' drew inspiration from Proletkult, an organisation set up in the wake of the Russian Revolution. Envisioning an imminent revolution spreading to Great Britain, they saw the development of a fighting proletarian culture as being requisite for social revolution. "Proletcult is practically synonymous with what is generally known in this country by the cumbrous name of Independent Working-Class Education"

Institutions founded on the basis of IWCE
 Central Labour College, London
 Scottish Labour College, Glasgow
 Victorian Labour College, Australia

References

Education theory
Working-class culture